James Frederick Keen (25 December 1895–1980) was an English footballer who played in the Football League for Bristol City, Hull City, Newcastle United, Queens Park Rangers and Wigan Borough.

References

1895 births
1980 deaths
English footballers
Association football forwards
English Football League players
Walker Celtic F.C. players
Carlisle United F.C. players
Bristol City F.C. players
Newcastle United F.C. players
Queens Park Rangers F.C. players
Hull City A.F.C. players
Darlington F.C. players
Wigan Borough F.C. players